Valamazu (also Romanized as Valamāzū; also known as Valeh Mūzū) is a village in Kolbad-e Gharbi Rural District, Kolbad District, Galugah County, Mazandaran Province, Iran. At the 2006 census, its population was 1,199, in 317 families.

References 

Populated places in Galugah County